Martin Ledwith is a Scottish actor and acting coach, best known for his work in theatre and television.

Early life 

Ledwith was born in Motherwell, Lanarkshire, the fourth son of Peter Ledwith and Theresa Gregory.

His first job in theatre was as a designer for Wiseguise Theatre, Glasgow. He designed productions at the Traverse Theatre, Edinburgh and the Tron Theatre, Glasgow.

Ledwith moved to London to study acting at the Royal Academy of Dramatic Art (RADA). At RADA he studied Stanislavski technique with Doreen Cannon and voice with Robert Palmer.

Stage career 

Ledwith's first role after leaving RADA was in the Royal Court production of "The Future Is Betamax" at the Ambassadors Theatre in London's West End.

His most recent stage role was as Sir Arthur Conan Doyle in Harvey Weinstein's production of Finding Neverland directed by Rob Ashford at the Curve theatre, Leicester.

Screen career 

Ledwith's first screen role was in "The Crow Road" (BBC) in 1996.

He is probably best known for his regular roles in two TV series. In "Heartbeat" (Yorkshire Television), he played the role of cheating philanderer, Andy Ryan in series 9 (1999).

In 2001–2002, Ledwith was a regular in "Holby City"(BBC) playing the part of Father Michael, who committed suicide after having an illicit affair with a nurse.

Other roles have included guest appearances in "Taggart" (STV), "The Whistleblower" (BBC), "Monarch of the Glen" (BBC) and "Superbugs" (WGBH-TV Boston).

Acting coach 

Ledwith is an acting coach and consultant for film, theatre and television. He originally taught Stanislavski Technique at London's City Lit. He has worked with actors and directors on a variety of projects including Spider-Man: Far From Home, Daredevil, Rogue One: A Star Wars Story, The Night Of, The Crown, The Collection, Salem, Deadpool, Snatch, The Americans, Pride and Prejudice and Zombies, Jason Bourne, Top Boy, Boardwalk Empire, Green Room, Guardians of the Galaxy, Humans, Quantico, '71, Prince of Persia, The Woman in Black, The Impossible, One Day, The Suspicions of Mr Whicher and Downton Abbey.

Other work 
Ledwith supplied the voices for the Streets' video, "World's Longest Music Video". He has voiced many radio and TV commercials.

Mentalism 
Ledwith had a brief parallel spell as a stage mentalist and psychological illusionist.

Selected theatre work 
 Conch in The Cut. Traverse Theatre, Edinburgh.
 Eddie in The Future Is Betamax Royal Court, London.
 Patrick in The Call. Royal Court, London.
 Dr John Bretton in Villette. Crucible Theatre, Sheffield.
 Gabriel Oak in Far From The Madding Crowd. Watermill Theatre, Newbury.
 Whitey in Terms of Abuse. Hampstead Theatre, London.
 Armstrong in An Experiment with an Air Pump. Hampstead Theatre, London.
 Hippolytus in Phaedra. Royal Lyceum, Edinburgh.
 Dowie in The Old Lady Shows Her Medals. Southwark Playhouse, London.
 Jim MacMillan in The Queen's English. Watford Palace Theatre.
 Bobby Gould in Speed The Plow. Library Theatre, Manchester.
 Banquo in Macbeth. Royal Lyceum, Edinburgh.
 Orsino in Twelfth Night. Horsecross Arts, Perth.
 The Producer in Six Characters In Search of An Author. Headlong Theatre.
 Arthur Conan Doyle in Finding Neverland. Curve, Leicester.

Selected filmography 

 Darren in The Crow Road, BBC
 Thomas and Jay Erskine in Taggart STV
 Mark McNeil in Dreamteam SKY. Recurring character.
 Vincent Shearer in The Whistleblower BBC
 Andy Ryan in Heartbeat Yorkshire. Series regular.
 Dr Nugent in Doctors BBC. Recurring character.
 Father Michael Chambers in Holby City BBC. Series regular.
 Martin Carter in Monarch of the Glen BBC.
 Alexander Fleming in SuperbugsWGBH Boston
 Sergeant Bryant in Comes A Bright Day Feature film.

http://www.channel4.com/info/press/press-packs/top-boy-director-jonathan-van-tulleken-talks-about-the-casting-for-s2

External links 
 https://www.imdb.com/name/nm0496714/

Living people
Year of birth missing (living people)
Scottish male stage actors
Scottish male television actors
Scottish male film actors
Alumni of RADA